The following is a list of state-level Speakers of the House (or state Assembly, depending upon the state) in the United States:

Records
Mike Madigan is cumulatively the longest serving state legislative speaker in U.S. history (serving from 1983-1995 and again from 1997 to 2021), while Tom Murphy served the longest consecutive tenure as state legislative speaker from 1973 to 2002.

References 

Speakers of state legislatures in the United States

Parliamentary titles
Legislatures
Government occupations
Positions of authority
Legal professions